The 2012 Galician regional election was held on Sunday, 21 October 2012, to elect the 9th Parliament of the autonomous community of Galicia. All 75 seats in the Parliament were up for election. The election was held simultaneously with a regional election in the Basque Country.

President Alberto Núñez Feijóo announced the election following Lehendakari Patxi López's decision to schedule a Basque snap regional election for 21 October 2012. The vote was seen as an electoral test on the economic policy of Mariano Rajoy's government, which had been elected at the 2011 Spanish general election and had undertaken harsh spending cuts which had seen its popularity ratings plummet in opinion polls. Feijóo aimed at securing reelection for a second term in office at the helm of the regional People's Party (PP), for which he needed the party to retain the absolute majority it commanded in parliament to prevent an alternative coalition being formed between the Socialists' Party of Galicia (PSdeG–PSOE) and the Galician Nationalist Bloc (BNG), similarly to the one in power in the 2005–2009 period.

The election resulted in an increased majority for Feijóo, as support for both the PSdeG and BNG plunged amid internal party infighting and disillusion from left-from-centre voters. The Galician Left Alternative (AGE) alliance, headed by former BNG leader Xosé Manuel Beiras and comprising United Left (EU) and Beiras's newly-created party Anova, obtained a surprise result with 200,000 votes and 14% of the share, scoring in third place regionally and displacing the PSdeG in second place in the cities of A Coruña, Ferrol and Santiago de Compostela. The fragmentation of the left-wing vote and the high abstention rate—with slightly over 45% of the electorate not casting a ballot—favoured the PP enlarging its majority despite seeing a drop of over 100,000 ballots from 2009.

Overview

Electoral system
The Parliament of Galicia was the devolved, unicameral legislature of the autonomous community of Galicia, having legislative power in regional matters as defined by the Spanish Constitution of 1978 and the regional Statute of Autonomy, as well as the ability to vote confidence in or withdraw it from a regional president.

Voting for the Parliament was on the basis of universal suffrage, which comprised all nationals over 18 years of age, registered in Galicia and in full enjoyment of their political rights. Amendments to the electoral law in 2011 required for Galicians abroad to apply for voting before being permitted to vote, a system known as "begged" or expat vote. The 75 members of the Parliament of Galicia were elected using the D'Hondt method and a closed list proportional representation, with an electoral threshold of five percent of valid votes—which included blank ballots—being applied in each constituency. Parties not reaching the threshold were not taken into consideration for seat distribution. Seats were allocated to constituencies, corresponding to the provinces of A Coruña, Lugo, Ourense and Pontevedra, with each being allocated an initial minimum of 10 seats and the remaining 35 being distributed in proportion to their populations.

The use of the D'Hondt method might result in a higher effective threshold, depending on the district magnitude.

Election date
The term of the Parliament of Galicia expired four years after the date of its previous election, unless it was dissolved earlier. The election decree was required to be issued no later than the twenty-fifth day prior to the date of expiry of parliament and published on the following day in the Official Journal of Galicia (DOG), with election day taking place between the fifty-fourth and the sixtieth day from publication. The previous election was held on 1 March 2009, which meant that the legislature's term would have expired on 1 March 2013. The election decree was required to be published in the DOG no later than 5 February 2013, with the election taking place up to the sixtieth day from publication, setting the latest possible election date for the Parliament on Saturday, 6 April 2013.

The president had the prerogative to dissolve the Parliament of Galicia and call a snap election, provided that it did not occur before one year had elapsed since a previous dissolution under this procedure. In the event of an investiture process failing to elect a regional President within a two-month period from the first ballot, the Parliament was to be automatically dissolved and a fresh election called.

Speculation on the 2013 Galician election being held ahead of schedule emerged after opinion polls at the end of 2011—shortly after the 2011 Spanish general election which saw a landslide victory for the People's Party (PP) across Spain—pointed to an "historic absolute majority" for the party in the region. In February 2012, Galician president Alberto Núñez Feijóo had ruled out a snap election "before the summer", a decision that he reiterated after the Andalusian regional election on 25 March had seen the PP losing over 400,000 votes in comparison to the party's 2011 general election results in the region. The media pointed out that Feijóo could be considering an autumn election instead, in order to prevent further spending cuts from the national PP government under Prime Minister Mariano Rajoy from affecting his image, On 21 August 2012, Lehendakari Patxi López's announcement of a snap Basque election for 21 October left Feijóo little room for an autumn election, and one week later he called a snap election in Galicia to be held concurrently with the Basque poll.

Background
The election was held amid a climate of falling popularity for the Mariano Rajoy's government, with the electoral campaign being focused on the austerity measures and spending cuts approved by the national PP government. In July 2012, a €65 billion-worth spending cut and a VAT rise from 18% to 21% was introduced, with such measures being heavily criticised because they were a breach of key campaign promises made by the PP in the party's election manifesto. The PP vote share had plummeted in national opinion polls from 40% to 34% as a result, raising fears within Núñez Feijóo's regional government on the possibility of losing their overall majority in the Galician regional election; this had seen an attempt to reform the regional electoral law by decreasing the size of the Parliament of Galicia from 75 to 61, under a seat apportionment that was seen as benefitting the PP's rural strongholds. The reform did not come to pass as a result of the snap poll and a lack of consensus with opposition parties for its approval.

The Galician Nationalist Bloc (BNG) had split following its 13th national assembly in January 2012 over dissatisfaction with the bloc's political line and the control exercised by the Galician People's Union (UPG). Among the splitting forces were Xosé Manuel Beiras's Encontro Irmandiño (EI), Nationalist Left (EN), Máis Galiza (+G), the Galician Nationalist Party–Galicianist Party (PNG–PG), the Galician Workers' Front (FOGA) and the Galician Socialist Space (ESG), whereas Inzar and the Socialist Collective chose to dissolve. The split parties would rally around a broad umbrella dubbed as the Novo Proxecto Común, which would provide the basis for the emergence of two new political forces: EI and the FOGA would join other political forces—such as the Galician People's Front (FPG) and Movemento pola Base (MpB)—into the new Renewal–Nationalist Brotherhood (Anova) party, while EN would merge with +G, ESG, PNG–PG, Terra Galega, Espazo Ecosocialista Galego and Acción Galega into the newly-established Commitment to Galicia (CxG).

Parliamentary composition
The Parliament of Galicia was officially dissolved on 28 August 2012, after the publication of the dissolution decree in the Official Journal of Galicia. The table below shows the composition of the parliamentary groups in the chamber at the time of dissolution.

Parties and candidates
The electoral law allowed for parties and federations registered in the interior ministry, coalitions and groupings of electors to present lists of candidates. Parties and federations intending to form a coalition ahead of an election were required to inform the relevant Electoral Commission within ten days of the election call, whereas groupings of electors needed to secure the signature of at least one percent of the electorate in the constituencies for which they sought election, disallowing electors from signing for more than one list of candidates.

Below is a list of the main parties and electoral alliances which contested the election:

Election debates

Opinion polls
The table below lists voting intention estimates in reverse chronological order, showing the most recent first and using the dates when the survey fieldwork was done, as opposed to the date of publication. Where the fieldwork dates are unknown, the date of publication is given instead. The highest percentage figure in each polling survey is displayed with its background shaded in the leading party's colour. If a tie ensues, this is applied to the figures with the highest percentages. The "Lead" column on the right shows the percentage-point difference between the parties with the highest percentages in a poll. When available, seat projections determined by the polling organisations are displayed below (or in place of) the percentages in a smaller font; 38 seats were required for an absolute majority in the Parliament of Galicia.

Results

Overall

Distribution by constituency

Aftermath

Notes

References
Opinion poll sources

Other

Regional elections in Galicia (Spain)
2012 in Galicia (Spain)
Galicia
October 2012 events in Europe